Michael McNamara is an Irish Gaelic footballer. He currently plays for the Sligo county team. In his first year with it, the team won the Connacht Championship for the first time since 1975 after beating Galway. A former member of the Arcadia Broncos lacrosse team, McNamara is said to bring the aggressiveness of a lacrosse defender to the pitch.

Honours
 1 Connacht Senior Football Championship (2007)
 1 National Football League Division 4 (2009)

References

Year of birth missing (living people)
Living people
Gaelic football backs
Sligo inter-county Gaelic footballers